Aragatsavan is a village in the Aragatsavan Municipality of the Aragatsotn Province of Armenia near the Armenia–Turkey border.

References

World Gazetteer: Armenia – World-Gazetteer.com

Kiesling, Rediscovering Armenia, p. 20, available online at the US embassy to Armenia's website

Populated places in Aragatsotn Province
Populated places established in 1924